Archway Academy is a 501(c)(3) non-profit, school that provides a sober learning environment for high school students in recovery from alcohol and substance use disorder.  Archway was established in 2003 by a group of concerned parents and addiction/mental health professionals. Together, these individuals recognized that the risk of relapse for teens coming out of treatment programs increases when they return to the same people and places that got them into trouble. Archway was formed to offer students an opportunity to grow academically, emotionally, spiritually and socially.  Archway expanded services in 2011 which the addition of the Passageway Program.  This program is designed specifically for teens in early recovery that do not yet meet the rigorous admission criteria for Archway. This expansion allows us to serve students and families in ALL phases of recovery and education.

"On a new path." Houston Chronicle. November 27, 2009. Retrieved on November 27, 2009.

The school's students come from inner city areas and suburban areas. The curriculum and teachers at Archway are from Southwest Schools, a state-funded charter school.

References

High schools in Houston
Private high schools in Texas